Bromley Brook School was a therapeutic boarding school in Manchester Center, Vermont, for teenage girls who were not functioning at traditional schools. The school was owned and operated by the Aspen Education Group. Bromley Brook was mentioned in The New York Times. 
 In March 2011, Aspen announced that the school would close at the end of the 2010–2011 academic year.

History
Bromley Brook School was established in 2004. Enrollment averaged about 80 students.

In December 2009, a male staff member was charged based on allegations of sexual activity with two female students. He pled guilty in April 2010.

In March 2011, Aspen Education Group announced that the school would close at the end of the 2010–2011 academic year as part of a restructuring of Aspen's operations. At the time of the announcement, there were 57 students enrolled and about 45 employees.

References

External links
Official school website

Therapeutic community
Bain Capital companies
Defunct schools in Vermont
Boarding schools in Vermont
Educational institutions established in 2004
Educational institutions disestablished in 2011
Buildings and structures in Manchester, Vermont
Schools in Bennington County, Vermont
Therapeutic boarding schools in the United States
2004 establishments in Vermont